Pigalle is a crater on Mercury. Its name was adopted by the International Astronomical Union (IAU) in 1976. Pigalle is named for the French sculptor Jean-Baptiste Pigalle.

To the southwest of Pigalle is the crater Matabei, and to the west is Guido d'Arezzo.

References

Impact craters on Mercury